Greenbank Historic Area is a historic grist mill located at Marshallton, New Castle County, Delaware. The property includes the Greenbank Mill, Robert Philips House, and the W. G. Philips House. The mill was built in 1790 and expanded in 1812. It is a  story, frame structure with a stone wing. The Robert Philips House was built in 1783, and is a  story, five bay, stone dwelling with a gable roof. The front facade features a long verandah. The W. G. Philips House, also known as the mill owner's house, dates to the mid-19th century. It consists of a two-story, three bay front section with a three-story, hipped roof rear section. Oliver Evans, a native of nearby Newport, installed his automatic mill machinery in the 1790 building.

It was listed on the National Register of Historic Places in 1973 and expanded in 1979 to include the W. G. Philips House.

The site is now operated as Greenbank Mill, a living history museum that includes the restored mill, an early 19th-century farm barn housing heritage sheep, the miller's house (Philips House), the textile factory and an herb garden.

References

External links

Greenbank Mill - official site

Historic American Buildings Survey in Delaware
Grinding mills on the National Register of Historic Places in Delaware
Houses on the National Register of Historic Places in Delaware
Buildings and structures in New Castle County, Delaware
Grinding mills in Delaware
Museums in New Castle County, Delaware
Living museums in the United States
Mill museums in Delaware
Houses in New Castle County, Delaware
National Register of Historic Places in New Castle County, Delaware